Boys Like Girls is an American rock band from Boston, Massachusetts. Formed in 2005, the group gained mainstream recognition when it released its self-titled debut album which went on to sell over 700,000 albums in the United States earning a Gold Record from the RIAA. The group's second studio album Love Drunk, was released on September 8, 2009 and their third album Crazy World, was released December 11, 2012.

The band toured worldwide between 2006 and 2013. Notable tours include their main stage appearance on the entire 2007 Vans Warped Tour, their first headline tour "Tourzilla" (2007) and a co-headliner with Good Charlotte for the Soundtrack of Your Summer Tour 2008.

The music video for their single "The Great Escape" (directed by Alan Ferguson) was voted the No. 1 video on MTV's TRL on August 6, 2007 and the band performed at MTV's TRL studio overlooking Times Square.

History

Formation and early years (2005–2006)
The group was formed in Andover, Massachusetts in the final months of 2005, when vocalist Martin Johnson, formerly of the Boston act Fake ID/The Drive, wrote a handful of songs he wanted to record. He recruited bassist Bryan Donahue and drummer John Keefe.  Keefe brought along lead guitarist Paul DiGiovanni, with whom he had recorded a brief demo, to complete the line-up. Some of the demo's titles were "Free", "If You Could See Me Now", and "The Only Way That I Know How To Feel". Some months later Keefe and DiGiovanni learned that they were distant cousins. The group later changed their name to Boys Like Girls.

The quartet soon opened a PureVolume account to showcase their music, and uploaded a rough demo of "The Great Escape" and an acoustic rendition of "Thunder".  By the end of the year, the group was on the No. 1 spot on the website's Top Unsigned Artists chart and within a few months had completed nationwide tours with Cute Is What We Aim For, Hit the Lights, All Time Low and Butch Walker.

Eventually, in 2006, the popularity of the band was overheard by booking agent Matt Galle and record producer Matt Squire, who contacted the band about a future collaboration. With their full support, Boys Like Girls embarked on their first nationwide tour with A Thorn for Every Heart, Hit the Lights and Keating in late February 2006. Following the month-long venture, the group immediately entered the recording studio with Squire to record their debut album for Columbia Records/Red Ink.

During their time in the studio Squire introduced the band to another of his alumni, Cute Is What We Aim For, who offered Boys Like Girls an opening slot on their upcoming headlining tour. Once the album was recorded, Boys Like Girls played back-to-back tours, including the Cute Is What We Aim For tour in June, as well as a two-week stint with Butch Walker in late July. In between tours the band filmed their first music video for their album's lead single, "Hero/Heroine", directed by Mark Serao and Chris Vaglio of Grey Sky Films.

Boys Like Girls (2006–2009)

On August 22, 2006, the eponymous Boys Like Girls was released. As of August 2008, the album has sold over 580,000 copies within the United States. While, as the title might suggest, songs about boys liking girls clearly prevail on the album, Johnson occasionally touched upon themes such as his mother's battle with cancer, leaving home, and promiscuous adolescents. Concerning the latter, he discussed the motivation behind the song "Dance Hall Drug":

The song "On Top of the World" is about Johnson's late mother.

In 2007, they began with a short headlining run with Self Against City, after which the group joined Cobra Starship supporting a two-month Cartel tour in February. In between releasing their album's second single, "The Great Escape" (reaching No. 9 on the Pop 100), performing on Jimmy Kimmel Live! on February 22, 2007, and eventually charting the Billboard 200 for the first time in April 2007, Boys Like Girls played their first international concerts during the Canada leg of a North American tour with Hellogoodbye and the UK festival Give It A Name 2007.

In mid-2006, the group performed on the annual Vans Warped Tour for the first time and on July 31, 2007 the band reached the No. 1 spot on the MTV show Total Request Live. The following month, on August 20, 2006, Boys Like Girls members Johnson and DiGiovanni played a private show at 105.1 The Buzz radio station. They announced that they would be performing five shows in Japan and said how much Good Charlotte helped their career.

In September 2006, Boys Like Girls released a three-song acoustic set for AOL's Sessions Under Cover as an EP in the iTunes Store, containing "The Great Escape", "Thunder" and a cover of Frou Frou's "Let Go". On December 4, 2007, the band performed a concert with Good Charlotte, with opening act NLT, for New Orleans radio station B97's "The Night B97 Stole Christmas" at the New Orleans House of Blues, located in the French Quarter.

Boys Like Girls played at the Slam Dunk Festival on the Glamour Kills stage, in Leeds, on Sunday, May 25, 2008. The group shared the stage with bands such as, Cute Is What We Aim For, Kids in Glass Houses, Valencia, We the Kings, You Me at Six and The Red Jumpsuit Apparatus. The band was also the opening act for Avril Lavigne's 2008 Best Damn Tour throughout the majority of North America.

During mid-2008, Boys Like Girls toured with Good Charlotte, The Maine, and Metro Station, for the Soundtrack of Your Summer Tour. The tour kicked off in Southaven, Mississippi with a performance named Red White and Boom hosted by Q107.5 on June 3, 2008. On July 4, 2008, they played in Pigeon Forge, Tennessee at the 2008 Starjam concert, along with Metro Station, Good Charlotte, Ace Young, and Menudo. Two months later, on August 5, 2008, Boys Like Girls and Metro Station performed together at Six Flags St. Louis in Missouri. In between tour dates, they worked alongside Nickelodeon pop singer Miranda Cosgrove on her upcoming debut album, released in 2009.

In 2008, five songs that were believed to be on the band's second album leaked onto the internet. The fan based EP, entitled Heavy Heart, consists of five demo songs that were recorded, but did not make it onto the band's first album. None of the songs would appear on their second record.

Boys Like Girls supported Fall Out Boy on their UK tour in October, along with You Me at Six. A month later the band's debut DVD, Read Between the Lines, was released on November 4, 2008.

In January 2009, Boys Like Girls toured the UK with Metro Station and Every Avenue supporting.

Love Drunk (2009–2010)
Johnson announced on his website that the band had begun to record their new album on February 10, 2009. It was recorded half in Vancouver and half in New York City with two different producers/production teams, in two different environments, and with two different styles of inspiration. The band embarked upon a 2009 fall tour with Cobra Starship, A Rocket to the Moon, The Maine, and VersaEmerge. The tour, known as 'The Op Tour' began on October 14 with the first show being in Buffalo, New York.

On June 18, Boys like Girls confirmed the title for their second album would be Love Drunk. The album was officially released on September 8, 2009. On June 24, 2009, the band released their first single, the title track of the album. The "Love Drunk" music video features actress and singer Ashley Tisdale. The group released their second single "She's Got a Boyfriend Now" on iTunes in August. The fourth song from Love Drunk is called "Two Is Better Than One," featuring and written with Taylor Swift. The song is about Johnson's previous relationship with a longtime girlfriend. Johnson had previously worked with Swift to write the song "You'll Always Find Your Way Back Home"., which is featured in Hannah Montana: The Movie.

The band made history on August 15, 2009 when it was featured alongside The All-American Rejects, Hoobastank, Raygun, Kasabian, Pixie Lott and Misha Omar as one of the live acts at Asia's very first MTV World Stage Live concert that was held in Malaysia.

The album is available for purchase on iTunes, Amazon, as well as many major retailers around the country on iTunes, there is a "Deluxe Version" of the album that contains 3 bonus tracks; "Love Drunk (Acoustic)", "Heart Heart Heartbreak (Acoustic)" and a Mark Hoppus remixed version of "Love Drunk".

Boys Like Girls made a video for their most recent single "Heart Heart Heartbreak". Boys Like Girls was on VH1's Top Twenty Countdown on February 13 to talk about their hit single "Two is Better Than One", which landed a number 8 spot on the countdown. The video was on the countdown for 8 consecutive weeks. When asked if they were filming a 3-D video or not, Johnson said they had already filmed the music video. Boys Like Girls second album, released in September 2009, was Love Drunk. In its first week, it sold more than 41,000 copies, landing it on the No. 8 spot on the Billboard 200.

In March 2010, Boys Like Girls supported Hedley along with Stereos and FeFe Dobson on select dates across Canada.

Boys Like Girls co-headlined The Bamboozle Roadshow 2010 between May and June 2010. All Time Low, Third Eye Blind, and LMFAO co-headlined with Boys Like Girls. Along with numerous other supporting bands, including 3OH!3, Good Charlotte, Forever The Sickest Kids, Cartel, and Simple Plan. Martin Johnson and Paul DiGiovanni had a small cameo in Good Charlotte's "Like It's Her Birthday" music video, along with The Maine's John O'Callaghan and Kennedy Brock.

Hiatus and solo projects (2010–2011)
Rumors surfaced on the internet about a year after the release of the band's second studio album Love Drunk, stating that the band is currently writing new material for their upcoming third studio album.

On September 1, 2010, the band posted a video on their official YouTube account announcing that they would be heading back to the studio to "do some preps and record" for album number 3.

On December 17, 2010, Johnson confirmed that they have completed writing the songs to be included in the upcoming record and that the band is currently recording demos-to-be-done in the studio with producer Matt Squire, with whom the band had worked on their self-titled album, Boys Like Girls.

In early 2011, rumors started spreading that Boys Like Girls had broken up, with no update from the band, its members or management team. They had no shows scheduled and told fans they were in the studio since September which turned out to be false. Drummer John Keefe was quick to deny these rumors, but along with the rest of the band has issued no statement to say that they are still recording and/or playing together.

As of February 2011, the band's members are working on individual projects. Johnson has been in the studio recording solo material as he prepares to tour in the summer playing his self written songs. He is also currently working with producers John Feldman and Tommy Brown who has previously worked with Black Eyed Peas. On the other hand, bassist Donahue is continuing with his side project Early Morning Blues, along with guitarist Paul DiGiovanni. DiGiovanni has also opened his own clothing range named "Black Carbon Custom" which he runs himself.

In June 2011, Johnson debuted several songs of his "solo material" on Kiss FM. Johnson also stated that the band would be going on an "indefinite hiatus", providing sufficient time for [Bryan/Paul] to tour in the later parts of the year as they remain in "Early Morning Blues" and himself to finish up his solo record, which was near its finishing touches. Johnson also confirmed that he was set to perform and tour under his very own name "Martin Johnson".

Departure of Bryan Donahue and Crazy World (2011–present)
In November 2011, Martin tweeted that he would post a video update the following day, which was later accompanied by a second tweet "...#boyslikegirlsisback". It was later revealed that the band would be commencing the preparation of the upcoming third studio album in the frontman's place back at Los Angeles.

On November 19, 2011, another video update from the official Boys Like Girls YouTube channel was uploaded, confirming that Boys Like Girls is currently recording a new album. However, the band's bassist Bryan Donahue unwillingly left the band. Reasons told were that Bryan had too many plans disrupting the band's progress and was apparently too "engrossed" in his other solo projects, Early Morning Blues and The Tower and the Fool.

In December 2011, the band posted a "studio update" video on their YouTube channel, revealing the trio undergoing recording session in the Sound Factory studio in LA. Also, frontman Martin had uploaded a picture on his Instagram, displaying a hand-written note which what seems like lyrics to a song the band has been recording titled "Be Your Everything".  The band have been posting videos of them in the studio recording a track called "Life of the Party", it also features gospel singers on the bridge. The band also posted on Instagram a picture taken of a hand-written note displaying lyrics of the song they are recording, which was later revealed to be titled "Stuck in the Middle". Johnson also stated that the song "Be Your Everything" would most probably be released as the untitled album's first single. On May 17, 2012 the name of the album was revealed as Crazy World which would be released sometime in Fall 2012.

As of May 2012, the band has confirmed that the new record to be released would be titled Crazy World and is set for a fall 2012 release. Martin & guitarist Paul have also confirmed several titles off the record, which are: "Be Your Everything", "Cheated", "Stuck in the Middle", "Leaving California", "Shoot", "Crazy World", "Take Me Home", "Red Cup, Hands Up, Long Brown Hair", "Life of the Party", "Hey You" & "The First Time". The band also made a small announcement that Morgan Dorr would be inducted as the band's permanent bassist, who is on tour with them currently.

On July 17, they released the "Crazy World" EP, containing three songs off the upcoming full-length album of the same name. The three songs are "Be Your Everything", "Life of the Party" and "The First Time".

In September 2012, the band kicked off a U.S Tour in New Hampshire headlining with The All American Rejects which also featured supporting bands such as Parachute and The Ready Set. This two-month nationwide tour, from the east coast to the west, instituted a comeback for the band on the road and on stage. They included mainly some of their older material alongside songs from their EP "Crazy World."

Following the release of Crazy World, a music video for "Be Your Everything" was created and a lyric video for "Life of the Party" was released as well. Paul has announced that the band has no plans to make any more music videos for Crazy World.

In August 2016, the band embarked on a tour to celebrate the ten-year anniversary of their self-titled debut album.

In a 2017 interview with New York City Monthly about his project The Night Game, Johnson stated the band hasn't broken up and may continue writing and recording.

Side projects and clothing labels

Early Morning Blues

On December 26, 2010, it was announced that the band's former bassist Bryan Donahue was releasing an EP, Newest Versions, that contained four exclusive tracks, of the group name "Early Morning Blues". It was recorded by several artists including Joey Heartland, Kevin Sanders, Paul DiGiovanni, Jimmy Welsh, Connor Bissett and Alex Correia.

Black Carbon Custom
On March 17, 2011, the band's lead guitarist, Paul DiGiovanni, appeared on The Gunz Show and announced that he is starting a new clothing line named "Black Carbon Custom". Up to date, there are only four shirts, Black Burn, Bombs, Burning World and Snake, and a hoodie, Shut Up and Color released under the clothing label.

The Rebels

In early 2011, John Keefe, the band's drummer, began collaborating with the Rebels, a Boston-based band. They have now changed their name to "Empire Kids".

Best of Friends
John Keefe, the band's drummer, and Morgan Dorr, the bassist, collaborated on a side project that began July 2012 but wasn't released until mid April 2013 that consists of them, Ethan Dorr, Allyn Dorr, Kevin Mchugh, Jamel Hawke and Mario Fanizzi. Their new side project is a modern Americana vibe, that began with a small performance for Kevin's wedding. The six-song debut ep was released in three parts.

Country music
Paul DiGiovanni has been occasionally involved in the genre of country music. He co-wrote Dan + Shay's single "How Not To", which reached No. 1 on Country Airplay in 2017, and produced Home State, the debut album of singer Jordan Davis.

Musical style and influences
Stylistically, the band lists its musical influences as a variety of contemporary, emo pop, punk, and alternative rock bands, such as Jimmy Eat World, Blink-182, Secondhand Serenade, Relient K, The Academy Is..., and Dashboard Confessional. While these tendencies are clearly audible in guitarwork and drumming, punk rock influences are far less obvious as far as vocal patterns and lyricism are concerned. Given Johnson's characteristic tenor vocal melodies, the band's all-around sound is geared to late '90s alternative radio rock, along the lines of Vertical Horizon, Goo Goo Dolls, and Eve 6.

Critical reception
While the online community crowned Boys Like Girls "2006's Fall Out Boy" (in reference to the pop punk band's commercial success with 2005's From Under the Cork Tree), album sales were less convincing. Despite promotional front page features (such as Spin's "Artist of the Day" or Absolutepunk.net's "Featured Band" and "Absolute Exclusive: Album Leak"), Boys Like Girls scanned a mere 1,472 units within its first week of sales, thus failing to chart the Billboard 200. However, continuous touring and promoting helped gaining the record a No. 179 entry into the chart in April 2007. It continued to gain popularity as the single, "The Great Escape", climbed the charts and eventually peaked at No. 55 in August 2007. After nearly falling off the Billboard 200, the re-release of the single "Hero/Heroine" jumped the album back up to No. 61 and was certified Gold shortly after.

Band members

Current members
 Martin Johnson – lead vocals, rhythm guitar (2005–present)
 Paul DiGiovanni – lead guitar, backing vocals (2005–present)
 Gregory James – bass guitar, backing vocals  (2021–present)
 John Keefe –  drums, percussion (2005–present)

Former members
 Bryan Donahue – bass guitar, backing vocals (2005–2011)
 Morgan Dorr – bass guitar, backing vocals  (2011–2021)

Timeline

Discography

 Boys Like Girls (2006)
 Love Drunk (2009)
 Crazy World (2012)

References

External links

 

Columbia Records artists
Sony Music artists
Alternative rock groups from Massachusetts
American emo musical groups
American pop rock music groups
Pop punk groups from Massachusetts
Rock music groups from Massachusetts
Musical groups established in 2005